Franklin Park is a borough in Allegheny County, Pennsylvania, United States. The population was 15,479 at the 2020 census. It is a suburb of the Pittsburgh metropolitan area.

Geography
Franklin Park is located at  (40.590459, -80.092046).

It is part of the North Allegheny School District, along with the Town of McCandless, Marshall Township and the borough of Bradford Woods, and participates in the multi-municipality Northland Public Library.

Surrounding neighborhoods
Franklin Park has eight borders, including Marshall Township to the north, Pine Township in the northeast corner, McCandless to the east, Ross Township to the southeast, Ohio Township to the south, Sewickley Hills to the west, Bell Acres from the west-northwest to northwest, and Economy in Beaver County in the northwest corner.

Demographics

As of the census of 2000, there were 11,364 people, 3,866 households, and 3,282 families residing in the borough. The population density was 836.5 people per square mile (323.1/km2). There were 3,973 housing units at an average density of 292.5 per square mile (113.0/km2).

Race/ethnic composition
The racial makeup of the borough was 95.05% White, 1.02% African American, 0.04% Native American, 2.89% Asian, 0.19% Pacific Islander, 0.17% from other races, and 0.64% from two or more races. Hispanic or Latino of any race were 0.54% of the population.

Household makeup
There were 3,866 households, out of which 45.2% had children under the age of 18 living with them, 78.0% were married couples living together, 4.9% had a female householder with no husband present, and 15.1% were non-families. 13.2% of all households were made up of individuals, and 5.3% had someone living alone who was 65 years of age or older. The average household size was 2.93 and the average family size was 3.23.

Age and gender
In the borough the population was spread out, with 30.8% under the age of 18, 4.5% from 18 to 24, 25.7% from 25 to 44, 29.6% from 45 to 64, and 9.4% who were 65 years of age or older. The median age was 40 years. For every 100 females there were 97.7 males. For every 100 females age 18 and over, there were 95.2 males.

Education and income
70% of adult residents had a bachelor's degree. The median income for a household in the borough was $121,661. The median income for a family was $94,521. Males had a median income of $77,517 versus $40,828 for females. The per capita income for the borough was $37,924. About 2.3% of families and 3.1% of the population were below the poverty line, including 4.2% of those under age 18 and 5.8% of those age 65 or over.

Recreation
Recreational areas of Franklin Park include:
 Acorn Park 
 Blueberry Hill Park
 Linbrook Park
 Fifer's fields Conservation Area
 Pennsylvania State Game Lands Number 203

Government and politics
Franklin Park is governed by an elected six-member council, mayor, and a hired manager.  Each of the borough's three wards elects two members to the council.  The council elects a President, vice-president, and Second Vice-president.

Each year, Council appoints a local high school student to serve as the Junior Councilperson.

[2017-2019] Republicans-5 (Hogg, Coombs, Lawrence, Myslinski, Lawrence, Schwartzmier), Multiparty-1 (Parks), Democrats-0

Schools
North Allegheny High School

References

External links
 Franklin Park Borough official website

Populated places established in 1800
Boroughs in Allegheny County, Pennsylvania